Honorary Fellows of Lincoln College, Oxford.

 Sir John Adye
 Naomi Alderman
 Sir Eric Anderson
 Sir Christopher Ball
 Julia Black
 Sir John Boardman
 John Bowers
 Sir Reader Bullard
 Gregory Cameron
 Sir David Clementi
 Steph Cook
 David Craig, Baron Craig of Radley
 Bernard Donoughue, Baron Donoughue
 Raymond Dwek
 Sir Roderick Eddington
 Robert Goff, Baron Goff of Chieveley
 Sir James Gowans
 Vivian H. H. Green
 Mark I. Greene
 Helena Hamerow
 Sir Philip Hampton
 David Henderson
 Philipp Hildebrand
 Sir Nicholas Hilliard
 Emily Howard
 Peter Kornicki
 John le Carré
 Robert Rogers, Baron Lisvane
 Sir Timothy Lloyd
 Sir Andrew Longmore
 Sir Colin Lucas
 Keith Murray, Baron Murray of Newhaven
 Nicola Shaw
A. W. B. Simpson
 Hugh Sloane
 James Watson

 Honorary
Lincoln